Howard Thurston (July 20, 1869 – April 13, 1936) was a stage magician from Columbus, Ohio, United States. His childhood was unhappy, and he ran away to join the circus, where his future partner Harry Kellar also performed. Thurston was deeply impressed after he attended magician Alexander Herrmann's magic show and was determined to equal his work. He eventually became the most famous magician of his time. Thurston's traveling magic show was the biggest one of all; it was so large that it needed eight train cars to transport his road show.

Early life 
Howard Thurston was born July 20, 1869, in Columbus, Ohio. He was the middle son of William and Margaret Thurston.  His father William Henry Thurston was a wheelwright and carriage maker who served briefly as a private during the Civil War in the Third Ohio Regiment. His mother Margaret (Cloude), was the daughter of an Ohio farmer.  He attended Mount Hermon School for Boys in Northfield, Massachusetts, class of 1893. Among his fellow students were Lee de Forest, "The Father of American Radio," and musical humorist Charles Ross Taggart, "The Old Country Fiddler."

When he was a child, Thurston practiced sleight of hand, but his mother viewed this as "devil's work". She later sent Thurston away to undertake Bible studies. Eventually, Thurston saw one of Alexander Hermann's shows, which led to Thurston's decision to begin his career as a magician.

Career 
Thurston said, "The historian of magic can trace an unbroken line of succession from the Fakir of Ava in 1830 to my own entertainment."

The King of Cards 
He is still famous for his work with playing cards. According to legend, a Mexican magician appeared at a magic shop owned by Otto Maurer in New York City. The enigmatic magician demonstrated how he could make cards disappear, one by one, at his fingertips.

Maurer showed Thurston the move, which he would later feature in his act. He added the "Rising Cards" trick from Professor Hoffman's Modern Magic, the book from which Thurston had learned the rudiments of magic. For this trick, he would walk into the audience and ask several people to choose cards from a deck of cards. The deck was shuffled and placed into a clear glass. Thurston would then call for the chosen cards. One by one the cards would rise up to the top of the deck.

Thurston arranged an impromptu audition with Leon Herrmann, nephew of Alexander Herrmann. His performance fooled Leon. From that point on he called himself "The man that fooled Herrmann" and used the publicity to get booked into top vaudeville houses in the U.S. and Europe, billing himself as the King of Cards.

Levitation illusion
Thurston became well known for performing a floating lady illusion known as the "Levitation of Princess Karnac". The illusion was originally performed by John Nevil Maskelyne and most famously by Harry Kellar.

Magic historian Jim Steinmeyer has written that "In Thurston's hands, the Levitation of Princess Karnac became a masterpiece. The beautiful trick was perfectly suited to Thurston's lyrical baritone." By 1908, the levitation illusion was sought by famous magicians. It was duplicated by Charles Joseph Carter on a world tour and had interested the magician Chung Ling Soo.

Later years 
Thurston continued presenting the Thurston–Kellar Show following the retirement of Kellar. He continued presenting for about thirty-five years until, on March 30, 1936, he suffered a stroke from a cerebral hemorrhage. He died on April 13 at his Oceanside apartment in Miami Beach, Florida. His death was attributed to pneumonia. He is entombed at Green Lawn Abbey, a mausoleum in Columbus, Ohio, which opened again to the public in 2021 after more than fifty years.

Legacy 
Thurston is quoted as a subject matter expert in Dale Carnegie's book How to Win Friends and Influence People. He appears in Part Two, Chapter One ("Do This and You'll Be Welcome Anywhere"), on pages 67–68 of the original text.

A poster for Thurston can be seen in many episodes of the TV show The Magicians hanging on the wall of the protagonists student house, known as 'the physical kids' dorm, so named because the magic they perform is physical, as opposed to say, psychic, or illusion based magic. The poster’s placement in the show would lead viewers to believe that Thurston was possibly a student of the school, and thus his performances used "real" magic.

Publications

Articles

Revealing the Mysteries of Magic, an exposure of the methods of the Egyptian conjuror Tahra Bey. The Day (January, 1926)
Thurston, Howard. The Truth About Indian Magic. Popular Mechanics (April, 1927)
Thurston, Howard. Magic and How It Is Made. Popular Mechanics (October, 1927)

Books

Howard Thurston's Tricks With Cards (1903)
50 New Card Tricks (1905)
Thurston's Easy Pocket Tricks: The A-B-C of Magic (1915)
The Mishaps of Magicians (1927)
Fooling Millions (1928)
Tales of Magic and Mystery (1928)
My Life of Magic (1929)
400 Tricks You Can Do (1940)

See also

References

Further reading 
 
 
 Worthington, Thomas Chew. (1938). Recollections of Howard Thurston: Conjurer, Illusionist and Author. (With an introduction by Henry Ridgely Evans). Baltimore.

External links 

 
 "ThurstonMasterMagician.com - The #1 Source For Howard Thurston Information."
 
 Howard Thurston Encyclopædia Britannica
 "Digital Howard" Classic Schemes
 
 Howard Thurston posters, held by the Billy Rose Theatre Division, New York Public Library for the Performing Arts

1869 births
1936 deaths
Deaths from pneumonia in Florida
American magicians
Vaudeville performers
People from Columbus, Ohio
Burials at Green Lawn Abbey
Northfield Mount Hermon School alumni